Israel Washburn Sr. (1784–1876) was a Massachusetts politician, brother of Reuel Washburn and father of Israel Washburn Jr., Elihu B. Washburne, Cadwallader C. Washburn, and William D. Washburn. Charles Ames Washburn was an elector and a diplomat. He married Martha Benjamin "Patty" Washburn and had eleven children with her, ten survived, including seven sons.

Family Origin

Israel Washburn Sr's family was from Massachusetts. Their ancestor emigrated from England in 1631.

He was born in Raynham, Massachusetts on Nov.18th, 1784. He was the son of Israel 4 Washburn and Abiah King, a lawyer in Raynham, MA. His grandfather and rear grandfather were also lawyers in Bridgewater, Plymouth County, MA.

Settlement in Maine

At 25 Israel Washburn Sr bought a homestead with some acres of farm lands at Nordlands, Livermore, Maine. He settled there.

He lived on farming and opened a general store.

On March 26, 1812 he married Martha Benjamin (1792-1861), daughter of Lieutenant Samuel Benjamin, a Revolutionary War Veteran, at Livermore, ME.

Political career

Israel Washburn was elected twice and he served in the Massachusetts House of Representatives 1815–1816 and 1818–1819.

He remained very active in local politics until 1829.

End of life

In 1829, his general store failed and Israel returned to farming.

He became blind at 75, in 1859. Two years after, in 1861 he lost his wife Martha.

He died on Sep 1st, 1876.

Notes

1784 births
1876 deaths
Members of the Massachusetts House of Representatives
Washburn family
19th-century American politicians